Monasterolo del Castello is a comune (municipality) in the Province of Bergamo in the Italian region of Lombardy, located about  northeast of Milan and about  northeast of Bergamo. 

Monasterolo del Castello borders the following municipalities: Adrara San Martino, Adrara San Rocco, Casazza, Endine Gaiano, Fonteno, Grone, Ranzanico, Spinone al Lago.

References